Corky means cork-like. It is an English and Irish unisex name that also serves as a nickname for Courtney. It may also refer to:

People
Sportspeople
Corky Ballas (born 1960), American competitive ballroom dancer
Corky or Corkie Blow (1877–1938), English footballer
Corky Calhoun (born 1950), American former National Basketball Association player
Corky Carroll (born 1947), American surfer
Dominic Cork (born 1971), English cricketer, nicknamed Corky
Corky de Graauw (born 1951), Dutch ice hockey player
Walter Devlin (1931–1995), American National Basketball Association player
Corky McMillin (1925–2005), American off-road desert racer and land developer
Corky Miller (born 1976), American Major League Baseball player
Corky Nelson (1939-2014), American high school and college football player and coach
Corky Palmer (born 1954), American college baseball coach
Corky Rogers (1943–2020), American high school football coach
Corky Valentine (1929–2005), American Major League Baseball pitcher
Claire Corky (born 1984), New Zealand rugby union player

Musicians
Corky Cornelius (1914–1943), American jazz trumpeter
Corky Hale (born 1936), American jazz musician
Corky James (born 1954), American guitarist and bassist
Corky Jones, pseudonym used by Buck Owens (1929-2006) for his rockabilly music
Corky Laing (born 1948), Canadian rock drummer
Corky Siegel (born 1943), American musician and composer

Artists
Corwin Clairmont (born 1946), Native American artist
Corky Lee (born 1948), American photographer
Corky Quakenbush, American stop motion filmmaker
Corky Trinidad (1939–2009), Philippine-American editorial cartoonist and comics artist

Politicians and activists
Corky Evans (born 1948), Canadian politician
Rodolfo Gonzales (1928–2005), Chicano boxer, poet and political activist
Corky Peterson, Canadian politician and trapper

Other professions
Charles A. Marvin (1929–2003), American judge and district attorney
Corky McCorquodale (1904–1968), American poker player
Corin Nemec (born 1971), American actor
Claude Nowell (1944–2008), also known as "Corky King" or "Corky Ra", American founder of Summum, a philosophical and religious organization
Gaetano Vastola (gangster) (born 1928), American mobster

Fictional characters
Corky Caporale, Corky Ianucci, and Corky DiGioia, in the television series The Sopranos
James "Corky" Corcoran, in the "Ukridge" stories of P. G. Wodehouse
Corky, in the film Bound
Corky, in the animated television series The Adventures of Bottle Top Bill and His Best Friend Corky
Corky Romano, in the film Corky Romano
Corky Sherwood, in the television series Murphy Brown
Corky Shimatzu, in the animated television series The Adventures of Jimmy Neutron: Boy Genius
Corky St. Clair, in the film Waiting for Guffman
Charles "Corky" Thatcher, in the television series Life Goes On 
Corky Wallet, in the comic strip Gasoline Alley
Corky Withers, in the novel Magic 
Corky the Hornet, the mascot of the Emporia State University sports teams
Corky the dog in Corky, a 1962 publication by Little Golden Books dedicated to Corky Goit
Corky, one of Jenny's friends in the Disney film Honey, We Shrunk Ourselves

Other uses
Corky (film), a 1972 stock car film starring Robert Blake
Corky (orca) (born 1965), the longest living orca in captivity
Alternative spelling of Corkey, a village in Northern Ireland
Cricket ball, commonly referred to as a corky
Charley horse, a leg cramp, called a corky in Australia

See also
Korky the Cat, a British comics character
Corky's, a restaurant in Los Angeles
Korki Buchek, fictional musician from the movie Borat
Cokie Roberts, journalist and author

Lists of people by nickname
Unisex given names